Megachile cincta is a species of bee in the family Megachilidae. It was described by Johan Christian Fabricius in 1781.

References

Cincta
Insects described in 1781